South Carrollton is a home rule-class city in Muhlenberg County, Kentucky, United States. The population was 184 at the 2000 census. Founded as Randolph Old Farm in 1838, an early pioneer changed the name of the city to honor his son, Carroll. The name was prefixed with south in order to disambiguate the city from Carrollton, Kentucky.

Geography
South Carrollton is located at  (37.336799, -87.141719).  The city lies along the western bank of the Green River, just north of Central City. U.S. Route 431 traverses South Carrollton, connecting the city with Central City to the south and Island to the north.  Kentucky Route 81 intersects US 431 in South Carrollton, connecting the city with Bremen and Sacramento to the northwest.

Demographics

As of the census of 2000, there were 184 people, 70 households, and 53 families residing in the city. The racial makeup of the city was 97.28% White, 0.54% African American, 0.54% Native American, and 1.63% from two or more races.

There were 70 households, out of which 35.7% had children under the age of 18 living with them, 60.0% were married couples living together, 12.9% had a female householder with no husband present, and 22.9% were non-families. 17.1% of all households were made up of individuals, and 4.3% had someone living alone who was 65 years of age or older. The average household size was 2.63 and the average family size was 2.94.

In the city, the population was spread out, with 22.8% under the age of 18, 9.8% from 18 to 24, 32.1% from 25 to 44, 21.7% from 45 to 64, and 13.6% who were 65 years of age or older. The median age was 39 years. For every 100 females, there were 109.1 males. For every 100 females age 18 and over, there were 118.5 males.

The median income for a household in the city was $27,500, and the median income for a family was $38,750. Males had a median income of $33,125 versus $14,375 for females. The per capita income for the city was $18,183. About 3.7% of families and 14.0% of the population were below the poverty line, including 11.5% of those under the age of eighteen and 9.7% of those 65 or over.

References

External links

Cities in Muhlenberg County, Kentucky
Cities in Kentucky
Populated places established in 1838
1838 establishments in Kentucky